Walker Américo Frônio (born 15 February 1982), commonly known as Walker, is a former Brazilian footballer who last played as a midfielder for Brazilian Paulista B club Independente.

Career
In 1999, Walker joined the Ajax Youth Academy coming from Guarani, he was crowned World Champions with the Brazil U-17 at the 1999 FIFA U-17 World Championship. That same year his Guarani youth team won the South American championship for under-17 teams. In July 2000, Walker Américo Frônio signed with Ajax. In 2001 and in 2002, Walker won the Dutch reserves competition title in the Beloften Eredivisie with Jong Ajax. He also made a great impression when he helped the reserves team to a semi-final appearance in the KNVB Cup in 2002. During the 2002–03 season, Walker played on loan of the Belgian satellite club Germinal Beerschot in Antwerp making a total of 21 appearances while scoring one goal. On 6 January his contract was terminated and he returned to Brazil where he played for Atlético Mineiro. He then continued his career playing for Juventude, Náutico, Itumbiara, Rio Claro, Santo André, Sertãozinho and Botafogo SP.

Honours

Club
Jong Ajax
 Beloften Eredivisie (2): 2001, 2002

International
Brazil U-17
 FIFA U-17 World Championship (1): 1999

References

External links

1982 births
Living people
Footballers from São Paulo (state)
Brazilian footballers
Association football midfielders
Eredivisie players
Belgian Pro League players
Campeonato Brasileiro Série A players
Campeonato Brasileiro Série B players
Guarani FC players
AFC Ajax players
Jong Ajax players
Beerschot A.C. players
Clube Atlético Mineiro players
Esporte Clube Juventude players
Clube Náutico Capibaribe players
Itumbiara Esporte Clube players
Brazilian expatriate footballers
Expatriate footballers in the Netherlands
Expatriate footballers in Belgium
Rio Claro Futebol Clube players
Batatais Futebol Clube players
Brazil youth international footballers